The Mad Parade is a 1931 Pre-Code American feature film about women canteen workers toiling in a château near the front lines in France during World War I. It was directed by William Beaudine and starred Evelyn Brent.  According to the American Film Institute catalog, this film was widely publicized as the first all-women cast picture, although off-stage male voices are heard and parts of their bodies are shown in the picture.

Cast
 Evelyn Brent as Monica Dale
 Irene Rich as Mrs. Schuyler
 Louise Fazenda as Fanny Smithers
 Lilyan Tashman as Lil Wheeler
 Marceline Day as Dorothy Quinlan
 Fritzi Ridgeway as Prudence Graham
 June Clyde as Janice Lee

References

External links

1931 films
1930s war drama films
American war drama films
American black-and-white films
Films directed by William Beaudine
Paramount Pictures films
1931 drama films
1930s English-language films
1930s American films